Hyptiotes dentatus is a spider species found in France.

See also 
 List of Uloboridae species

References

External links 

Uloboridae
Fauna of France
Spiders of Europe
Spiders described in 2008